The Karnataka State Film Award for Third Best Film is one of the Karnataka State Film Awards presented annually since the awards were instituted for films of 1966–67. The award is given to Kannada films produced in the year.

The makers of Sandhya Raga (1966) were the first recipients and that of Ondalla Eradalla (2018) the latest.

Awards 

All the awardees are awarded with a cash prize of 50,000 and a 100-gram silver medal. Award winners include producer and director of the film.

Winners

See also
 Karnataka State Film Award for First Best Film
 Karnataka State Film Award for Second Best Film

References

Karnataka State Film Awards